Penedo da Saudade, previously known as Pedra dos Ventos (Boulder of the Winds) is a historical public garden in Coimbra, Portugal. The garden has partial views of Coimbra skyline and the Coimbra City Stadium. A long winding walkway leads down the hill through a wooded area, from the main section of the garden all the way down to Infanta Dona Maria street.

History 

Removed

Monuments 

Beyond the many stone slabs with poems and songs from past students of the University, the garden also is also home to three monuments: A statue depicting Portuguese poet and educationalist João de Deus, as well as a bust of writer Eça de Queirós, and another of romantic poet António Nobre.

References 

Coimbra
Gardens in Portugal